Edward Wineapple (August 10, 1905 – July 23, 1996) was a professional baseball pitcher. He played in one game in Major League Baseball for the Washington Senators during the 1929 season.

Biography
Wineapple was born in Boston, Massachusetts, and was Jewish. He attended Syracuse University for his college freshman year, then transferred to Providence College, where he was a star basketball player for three years. A first-team All-American his senior year, he led the 1928-29 team to a 17-3 record and was the second-leading scorer in the nation.

His lone major league appearance came on September 15, 1929, in the Senators' 16–2 loss to the Detroit Tigers at Griffith Stadium. He took the mound in the sixth inning with the Tigers already holding a 12–2 lead, entering the game as part of a double switch in which he took the place of Baseball Hall of Fame shortstop Joe Cronin in the Washington lineup. Wineapple hurled the final four innings in relief, giving up four runs (two earned) on seven hits, walking three and striking out one against a Tigers lineup that featured Hall of Famer Charlie Gehringer.

From 1928 to 1931, he played summer baseball in the Cape Cod Baseball League (CCBL), where it was reported that Wineapple "seems to play baseball as he does basketball...with his heart in it all the time. He is pitching and hitting exceptionally well." Wineapple played for the CCBL's Osterville town team from 1928 to 1930, and for the Orleans team in 1931.

Wineapple was inducted into the Providence College sports hall of fame as part if its inaugural class of 1970. He died in Delray Beach, Florida in 1996 at age 90.

References

Further reading

External links

1905 births
1996 deaths
Washington Senators (1901–1960) players
Major League Baseball pitchers
New Haven Profs players
Elmira Colonels players
Harrisburg Senators players
Wilmington Pirates players
Buffalo Bisons (minor league) players
Wilkes-Barre Barons (baseball) players
Cape Cod Baseball League players (pre-modern era)
Hyannis Harbor Hawks players
Orleans Firebirds players
All-American college men's basketball players
Baseball players from Massachusetts
Basketball players from Massachusetts
Providence Friars baseball players
Providence Friars men's basketball players
Jewish American baseball players
Jewish Major League Baseball players
American men's basketball players
20th-century American Jews